The Week of Silence is a charity challenge in which participants remain utterly silent for five straight days. Their silence symbolizes the silence of the untold victims of rape, sexual assault, and sexual abuse.  Participants ask their friends and family to sponsor them monetarily, and all proceeds are donated to the Rape, Abuse, and Incest National Network (RAINN).

The Week of Silence was first proposed in 2004 on an online LiveJournal community by a sexual abuse survivor going by the name of "Ros". The first challenge took place in March of the following year and was successful. Not only did several of the members of the online community for abuse victims participate themselves, but many of them convinced friends to join them in the challenge.  

Each year, the number of participants and the amount of donations have increased. As of March 2007, the US-based Week now had participants from several locations around the globe, including Australia, New Zealand, various European countries, Mexico, and Russia.

The main contacts to the organization are through Victoria Spring (director) and Chelly Johnson (co-director).

The Week of Silence has continued annually since 2005.

Sexual abuse victims advocacy
Advocacy groups